Bjarne Eilif Thorvik (6 June 1908 - 7 June 1972) was a Norwegian politician for the Labour Party.

He served as a deputy representative to the Norwegian Parliament from Østfold during the terms 1954–1957 and 1958–1961.

References

1908 births
1972 deaths
Labour Party (Norway) politicians
Deputy members of the Storting